The Mbewum were an indigenous Australian people of the Cape York Peninsula of northern Queensland. They were dispossessed and became extinct soon after colonization.

Language
The Mbewum spoke Mbiywom, a northern Paman language

Country
The Mbewum had an estimated  of tribal domain territory on the Upper Watson River, which included Merluna in the area 120 miles south-east of Weipa.  Their land, together with that of the Totj was incorporated into a state-run enterprise, the Queensland State Pastoral Station of that name, which by 1916 was running over 12,000 head of cattle.

Social organization
They had four kinship divisions like other tribes in the area, according to R. H. Mathews.

Alternative names
 KokMbewan
 Mbe:wum, Mbeiwum, M-Berwum
 Bywoom
 Kokinno
 Kokimoh

Notes

Citations

Sources

Aboriginal peoples of Queensland